Reza Amirkhani (born 16 May 1973)  is a contemporary Iranian novelist.

He started writing at high school with "Ermia" novel.
He has studied mechanical engineering at Sharif University of Technology and is a graduate of National Organization for Development of Exceptional Talents; he also writes essays and researches about scientific & social problems.

There are also Dastan-e-Sistan and Nasht-e-Nesha written by him that describes some social problems and their solutions.
Man-e-oo (His Ego) is one of Amirkhani's most well-known works, having been reprinted 38 times. It has been translated into Arabic, Russian, and Turkish.

Works
 1996:Ermia
 2000:Naser Armani (Armenian Nasser- 11 Stories)
 2002:Az Be (From - To)
 2000:Man-e-oo (His Ego)
 2003:Dastan-e-Sistan (about ten day travel with supreme leader of Iran)
 2005:Nasht-e-Nesha (an article about Iranian brain drain)
 2008:Bi Vatan ("Homelandless")
 2010:Sar-Lohe-Ha ( His notes in Louh website)
 2010:Nafahat -e- naft (an essay about oil management)
 
 
 2012:Gheydar (Kedar)
 2018:Rahesh (An essay about Management and development of urban imbalance)
 2021: A Half of One-Sixth of Pyongyang

Awards
 Reza Amirkhani's work "Salvation" ("Rahesh"), about the effects of urban expansion on a young couple living in Tehran, was named best novel at the 11th Jalal Al-e Ahmad Literary Awards.
 For his work "Salvation," Amirkhani was nominated for the Islamic Revolution Artist of the Year award in 2019.

References

External links
 Author's website
 
  Home-less-ness: a novel by Reza Amirkhani

See also
 
 http://www.minorliterature.com/2018/01/21/this-street-has-no-rumble-strip-booklessness-share-jalal-award/
 
 

1973 births
Living people
Iranian writers
Iranian male short story writers
Sharif University of Technology alumni
Iranian columnists
Iran's Book of the Year Awards recipients